John Campbell (born 1956) is Willis S. and Marion Slusser Professor of Philosophy at the University of California in Berkeley, California.  He works primarily in philosophy of mind.

Education and career
Campbell earned a BA at the University of Stirling, UK in 1978; an MA at the University of Calgary, Canada in 1979; and a DPhil from Christ Church, Oxford in 1983 with a thesis under the title Spatiotemporal Thinking.

Before moving to Berkeley, Campbell taught at Oxford University for a number of years. He was a Fellow of New College. In 2000 he was awarded the Wilde Professorship of Mental Philosophy. He has additionally taught at the University of California at Los Angeles and King's College, University of Cambridge.

He was a Guggenheim Fellow, a Fellow at the Centre for Advanced Studies in Behavioural Sciences at Stanford University, a British Academy Research Reader and between 2003-2006 was the President of the European Society for Philosophy and Psychology.

Philosophical  work

Campbell specializes in the philosophy of mind with special emphasis on questions relating to perception.

His books include Past, Space, and Self (MIT Press, 1994) and Reference and Consciousness (Oxford University Press, 2002).

Notes

References
 Reference and Consciousness - John Campbell. Oxford University Press. Accessed 2011-01-20.
 John Campbell. University of California Berkeley Department of Philosophy. Accessed 2011-01-20.

External links
John Campbell's webpage at UC Berkeley

Scottish philosophers
Living people
1956 births
Wilde Professors of Mental Philosophy
Fellows of Corpus Christi College, Oxford
Alumni of the University of Oxford
University of Calgary alumni
Alumni of the University of Stirling
University of California, Berkeley College of Letters and Science faculty